Pachyanthidium lachrymosum is a species of bee in the genus Pachyanthidium, of the family Megachilidae.

References
 http://animaldiversity.org/accounts/Pachyanthidium_lachrymosum/classification/
 https://www.itis.gov/servlet/SingleRpt/SingleRpt?search_topic=TSN&search_value=756057
 http://bionames.org/taxa/gbif/1334309
 http://collections.si.edu/search/record/nmnhentomology_11102593

Megachilidae
Insects described in 1879